An ecological area is a type of New Zealand protected area. They are usually large (about 1000 to 1500 hectares in size) and usually feature the main ecosystems of a defined ecological district. There are currently 57 recognised ecological areas in New Zealand.

Like sanctuary areas, most ecological areas were set aside by the now defunct New Zealand Forest Service in the 1970s and 1970s in response to activism by the conservationist movement. Historically, ecological areas have mostly confined to the West Coast and Southland Region of the South Island, and the Bay of Plenty Region of the North Island.

Ecological areas are usually accessible to the general public, not dogs are prohibited.

North Island

Auckland Region

 Omaha Ecological Area

Waikato Region

 Hapuakohe Ecological Area
 Kapowai Ecological Area
 Moehau Ecological Area
 Otahu Ecological Area
 Papakai Ecological Area
 Raepahu Fernbird Ecological Area
 Taumatatawhero Ecological Area
 Waihaha Ecological Area
 Waiomu Ecological Area
 Whenuakura Ecological Area

Manawatū-Whanganui Region

 Manakau Ecological Area
 Maramataha Ecological Area
 Pukepoto Ecological Area
 Rotokuru Ecological Area
 Whenuakura Ecological Area

Wellington Region

 Manakau Ecological Area
 Penn Creek Ecological Area

South Island

Tasman District

 Mokihinui Forks Ecological Area

West Coast Region

 Ahaura Terraces Ecological Area
 Atbara-Nile Ecological Area
 Bell Hill - Granite Hill Ecological Area
 Berlins Bluff Ecological Area
 Blackwater River Ecological Area
 Bywash Pakihi Ecological Area
 Card Creek Ecological Area
 Coal Creek Ecological Area
 Deadman Ecological Area
 Deep Creek Ecological Area
 Doctor Hill Ecological Area
 Flagstaff Ecological Area
 Fletcher Creek Ecological Area
 Glasseye Creek Ecological Area
 Granville Ecological Area
 Greenstone Ecological Area
 Kakapotahi Ecological Area
 Kaniere Ecological Area
 Karamea Bluff Ecological Area
 Lake Hochstetter Ecological Area
 Lower Poerua Ecological Area
 Mokihinui Forks Ecological Area
 Moonlight Ecological Area
 Mount Harata Ecological Area
 Nancys Clearing Ecological Area
 Ngakawau Ecological Area
 Okarito Forks Ecological Area
 Orikaka Ecological Area
 Oroko Swamp Ecological Area
 Otututu Ecological Area
 Radcliffe Ecological Area
 Roaring Meg Ecological Area
 Saltwater Ecological Area
 Saxton Ecological Area
 Te Wharau Ecological Area
 Three Mile Hill Ecological Area
 Tiropahi Ecological Area
 Upper Totara Ecological Area
 Waipuna Ecological Area

Otago Region

 Aramoana Ecological Area

Southland Region

 Lindsay Ecological Area

References

Protected areas of New Zealand
Lists of tourist attractions in New Zealand
New Zealand environment-related lists